Chaly may refer to:

Chaly (surname)
Chaly Jones (born 1977)
Shali, East Azerbaijan
Cheli, Iran (disambiguation) (various places)
"Chaly", mascot of the band, Overkill, a skeletal bat with a skull-like face